The 1973–74 World Hockey Association All-Star Game was held in the just opened St. Paul Civic Center in St. Paul, Minnesota, home of the Minnesota Fighting Saints, on January 3, 1974. The East All-Stars defeated the West All-Stars 8–4. Mike Walton was named the game's most valuable player.

Team Lineups
{| width=100%
| valign=top width=50% align=left |

East All-Stars
 Coach: Jack Kelley (New England Whalers)

† Suited, but did not play.
‡ Unable to participate due to injury.
| valign=top width=50% align=left |

West All-Stars
 Coach: Bobby Hull (Winnipeg Jets)Assisted by: Nick Mickoski (Winnipeg Jets)

‡ Unable to participate due to injury.
| valign=top width=50% align=left |
|-
|colspan="2" |
G = Goaltender; D = Defenceman; C = Center; LW = Left Wing; RW = Right Wing

Source:

Game summary 

Goaltenders : 
 East: Cheevers (29:15 minutes, 2 goals against), Gratton (30:45 minutes, 2 goals against).
 West: Norris (20 minutes, 5 goals against), Wakely (20 minutes, 1 goal against), Garrett (20 minutes, 2 goals against).

Shots on goal : 
 East (34) 10 - 12 - 10
 West (30) 10 - 13 -  7

Referee : Bob Sloan

Linesmen : Alan Glaspell, Gene Kusy

Source:

See also
1973–74 WHA season

References

WHA All-Star Game

All
Ice hockey competitions in Saint Paul, Minnesota